Gerrit Bolhuis (Amsterdam, Netherlands, 23 June 1907 - Amsterdam, 19 November 1975) was a Dutch sculptor.

Bolhuis studied at the Kunstnijverheidsschool Quellinus and studied from 1928 to 1930 drawing and from 1930 to 1934 sculpture from teachers Jan Bronner and Hendrik Adriaan van der Wal at the Academy of Fine Arts in Amsterdam. He was the favorite pupil of Bronner and in 1934 the winner of the Dutch Prix de Rome. With the annuity of the Prix de Rome, he lived with his wife, the artist Annetje Meijs, three years in Rome and in Paris. After his return again in the Netherlands he settled in Amsterdam, where he lived his entire life. In 1938 his application for membership of the Dutch Society of Sculptors in Amsterdam was first rejected. After the so-called "Bolhuis incident" in which seven members (among others John Rädecker and Han Wezelaar) quit the organisation, Bolhuis finally was accepted as a member.

After World War II he made resistance and liberation monuments in the Dutch municipalities Winterswijk, Epe, Beverwijk and Amsterdam.

Bolhuis died in 1975 and was buried in Amsterdam.

External links
 Fotocollectie G. Bolhuis at the International Institute of Social History

1907 births
1975 deaths
Dutch male sculptors
Prix de Rome (Netherlands) winners
Artists from Amsterdam
20th-century Dutch sculptors
20th-century Dutch male artists